The Duchy of Guelders is a historical duchy, previously county, of the Holy Roman Empire, located in the Low Countries.

Geography
The duchy was named after the town of Geldern (Gelder) in present-day Germany. Though the present province of Gelderland (English also Guelders) in the Netherlands occupies most of the area, the former duchy also comprised parts of the present Dutch province of Limburg as well as those territories in the present-day German state of North Rhine-Westphalia that were acquired by Prussia in 1713.

Four parts of the duchy had their own centres, as they were separated by rivers:
 the quarter of Roermond, also called Upper Quarter or Upper Guelders – upstream on both sides of the Maas, comprising the town of Geldern as well as Erkelenz, Goch, Nieuwstadt, Venlo and Straelen;
spatially separated from the Lower Quarters (Gelderland):
 the quarter of the county Zutphen, also called the Achterhoek – east of the IJssel and north of the Rhine, including Doesburg, Doetinchem, Groenlo and Lochem;
 the Veluwe Quarter with Arnhem as its capital – west of the IJssel and north of the Rhine, with Elburg, Harderwijk, Hattem and Wageningen;
 Nijmegen Quarter, including Betuwe – south of the Rhine and north of the Maas (in between the rivers), including Gendt, Maasbommel, Tiel and Zaltbommel

History

Wassenberg and Jülich dynasties (c.1096–1423)
The county emerged about 1096, when Gerard III of Wassenberg was first documented as "Count of Guelders". It was then located on the territory of Lower Lorraine, in the area of Geldern and Roermond, with its main stronghold at Montfort (built 1260). Count Gerard's son Gerard II in 1127 acquired the County of Zutphen in northern Hamaland by marriage. In the 12th and 13th century, Guelders quickly expanded downstream along the sides of the Maas, Rhine, and IJssel rivers and even claimed the succession in the Duchy of Limburg, until it lost the 1288 Battle of Worringen against Berg and Brabant.

Guelders was often at war with its neighbours, not only with Brabant, but also with the County of Holland and the Bishopric of Utrecht. However, its territory grew not only because of its success in warfare, but also because it thrived in times of peace. For example, the larger part of the Veluwe and the city of Nijmegen were given as collateral to Guelders by their cash-strapped rulers. On separate occasions, in return for loans from the treasury of Guelders, the bishop of Utrecht granted the taxation and administration of the Veluwe, and William II – Count of both Holland and Zeeland, and who was elected anti-king of the Holy Roman Empire (1248–1256) – similarly granted the same rights over Nijmegen; as neither ruler proved able to repay their debts, these lands became integral parts of Guelders.

In 1339 Count Reginald II of Guelders (also styled Rainald), of the House of Wassenberg, was elevated to the rank of Duke by Emperor Louis IV of Wittelsbach. After the Wassenberg line became extinct in 1371 following the deaths of Reginald II's childless sons Edward II (on 24 August, from wounds suffered in the Battle of Baesweiler) and Reginald III (on 4 December), the ensuing Guelders War of Succession saw William I of Jülich emerge victorious.  William was confirmed in the inheritance of Guelders in 1379, and from 1393 onwards held both duchies in personal union (in Guelders as William I, and in Jülich as William III).

Egmond and Burgundian dynasties (1423–1477)
In 1423 Guelders passed to the House of Egmond, which gained recognition of its title from Emperor Sigismund of Luxembourg, but was unable to escape the political strife and internecine conflict that had so plagued the preceding House of Jülich-Hengebach, and more especially, the pressure brought to bear by the expansionist rulers of the Duchy of Burgundy. The first Egmond Duke, Arnold, suffered the rebellion of his son Adolf and was imprisoned by the latter in 1465. Adolf, who had enjoyed the support of Burgundian Duke Philip III ("the Good") and of the four major cities of Guelders during his rebellion, was unwilling to strike a compromise with his father when this was demanded by Philip's successor, Duke Charles the Bold. Charles had Duke Adolf captured and imprisoned in 1471 and reinstated Arnold on the throne of the Duchy of Guelders. Charles then bought the reversion (i.e., the right of succession to the throne) from Duke Arnold, who, against the will of the towns and the law of the land, pledged his duchy to Charles for 300,000 Rhenish florins. The bargain was completed in 1472–73, and upon Arnold's death in 1473, Duke Charles added Guelders to the "Low Countries" portion of his Valois Duchy of Burgundy.

Habsburg dynasty (1477–1549)
Upon Charles' defeat and death at the Battle of Nancy in January 1477, Duke Adolf was released from prison by the Flemish, but died the same year at the head of a Flemish army besieging Tournai, after the States of Guelders had recognized him once more as Duke. Subsequently, Guelders was ruled by Habsburg Holy Roman Emperor Maximilian I, husband of Charles the Bold's daughter and heir, Mary.

The last independent Duke of Guelders was Adolf's son Charles of Egmond (1467–1538, r. 1492–1538), who was  raised at the Burgundian court of Charles the Bold and fought for the House of Habsburg in battles against the armies of Charles VIII of France, until being captured in the Battle of Béthune (1487) during the War of the Public Weal (also known as the Mad War). In 1492, the citizens of Guelders, who had become disenchanted with the rule of Maximilian, ransomed Charles and recognized him as their Duke. Charles, now backed by France, fought Maximilian's grandson Charles of Habsburg (who became Holy Roman Emperor, as Charles V, in 1519) in the Guelders Wars and expanded his realm further north, to incorporate what is now the Province of Overijssel. He was not simply a man of war, but also a skilled diplomat, and was therefore able to keep his independence. He bequeathed the duchy to Duke William the Rich of Jülich-Cleves-Berg (also known as Wilhelm of Cleves). Following in the footsteps of Charles of Egmond, Duke William formed an alliance with France, an alliance dubiously cemented via his political marriage to French King Francis I's niece Jeanne d'Albret (who reportedly had to be whipped into submission to the marriage, and later bodily carried to the altar by the Constable of France, Anne de Montmorency). This alliance emboldened William to challenge Emperor Charles V's claim to Guelders, but the French, mightily engaged on multiple fronts as they were in the long struggle to against the Habsburg "encirclement" of France, proved less reliable than the Duke's ambitions required, and he was unable to hold on to the duchy; in 1543, by the terms of the Treaty of Venlo, Duke William conceded the Duchy of Guelders to the Emperor.

Part of the Seventeen Provinces
Emperor Charles V united Guelders with the Seventeen Provinces of the Habsburg Netherlands by the Pragmatic Sanction of 1549, and Guelders thus lost its independence.

Charles abdicated in 1556 and decreed that the territories of the Burgundian Circle should be held by the Spanish Crown. When the Netherlands revolted against King Philip II of Spain in the Dutch Revolt, the three northern quarters of Gelderland joined the Union of Utrecht and became part of the United Provinces upon the 1581 Act of Abjuration, while only the Upper Quarter remained a part of the Spanish Netherlands.

At the Treaty of Utrecht, ending the War of the Spanish Succession in 1713, the Spanish Upper Quarter was again divided between Prussian Guelders (Geldern, Viersen, Horst, Venray), the United Provinces (Venlo, Montfort, Echt), Austria (this part continued as the duchy: Roermond, Niederkrüchten, Weert), and the Duchy of Jülich (Erkelenz). In 1795 Guelders was finally conquered and incorporated by the French First Republic, and partitioned between the départements of Roer and Meuse-Inférieure.

Coat of arms of Guelders
The coat of arms of the region changed over time.

Guelders in popular culture
William Thatcher, the lead character in the 2001 film A Knight's Tale played by Heath Ledger, claimed to be Sir Ulrich von Liechtenstein from Gelderland so as to appear to be of noble birth and thus qualify to participate in jousting.

Set in the late 1460s, the main character in Rafael Sabatini's 1929 novel The Romantic Prince is Count Anthony of Guelders, elder son of Duke Arnold and brother to Adolf "since then happily vanished".  Sabatini weaves the historical characters and events of the period through the story.

The folk/metalband Heidevolk, based in Gelderland, composed and performs a range of songs about Gelre/Guelders, among them a contemporary anthem "".

List of rulers

See also
Prussian Guelders
Spanish Guelders

Notes

References

Nijsten, Gerard. In the Shadow of Burgundy: The Court of Guelders in the Late Middle Ages (Cambridge University Press, 2004)

External links

 

Map of Upper Guelders in 1789 – Northern Part
Map of Upper Guelders in 1789 – Southern Part

 
Duchies of the Holy Roman Empire
Seventeen Provinces
History of Gelderland
1470s in the Burgundian Netherlands
Medieval Germany
Medieval Netherlands